Sadiku is a surname. Notable people with the surname include:

Armando Sadiku (born 1991), Albanian footballer
Elena Sadiku (born 1993), Kosovar footballer
Loret Sadiku (born 1991), Albanian footballer
Orget Sadiku, Albanian composer
Matthew Olanipekun Sadiku, American engineer

Albanian-language surnames